The Tucson Convention Center (previously named the Tucson Community Center) is a large multi-purpose convention center located in downtown Tucson, Arizona. The complex was listed on the National Register of Historic Places in 2015.

Performance venues
The Linda Ronstadt Music Hall, with 2,289 seats, is used for concert performances, including opera. Known originally as the Tucson Music Hall, it was renamed in honor of Tucson native Linda Ronstadt in 2022.
Leo Rich Theater, with 511 seats, is used for small scale and more intimate performances.
Tucson Arena, with maximum capacity of 8,962. In the 200 seating series, total capacity is 4,988, 100 series total capacity is 2,724 and the floor capacity is 1,250. Standard hockey capacity is 6,521.

Tucson Roadrunners 
Beginning from the fall of 2016, Tucson Arena has been home to the Tucson Roadrunners in the American Hockey League.

University of Arizona Hockey
The University of Arizona Wildcats club hockey team currently plays at Tucson Arena. Although associated with the college, the team receives no funding directly from the school. The hockey team is a Division 1 member of the American Collegiate Hockey Association. Leo Golembiewski had been the head coach for the last 27 years, leading the team to 21 straight national tournaments with eight semi-final appearances and one national championship. The current coach is Chad Berman, in his first year with the team.

Tucson Sugar Skulls
On August 23, 2018, the Indoor Football League announced the addition of the expansion Tucson Sugar Skulls to begin play in 2019.

Other events
The Tucson Convention Center has been host to many other events including the Tucson Gem & Mineral Show, Jehovah's Witnesses Regional Conventions, the Ringling Brothers and Barnum and Bailey Circus, concerts, monster truck shows as well as many live WWE television broadcasts featuring Raw, SmackDown & ECW. In 1999, the arena hosted an Empty Arena match between The Rock and Mankind for the WWF Championship, which aired during halftime of Super Bowl XXXIII.

While McKale Center was being built at the University of Arizona, the Wildcats briefly considered playing some of its 1971-72 men's basketball games at Tucson Arena, but eventually decided against doing so, opting to remain in Bear Down Gymnasium until McKale Center was ready.

The arena also hosted a concert played by Elvis Presley on November 9, 1972. He would return again on June 1, 1976.

Ventriloquist and comedian Jeff Dunham hosted a show at the arena as part of his "Seriously!?" tour on October 3, 2021.

Past minor league teams
Tucson Mavericks, Central Hockey League (1975–76)
Tucson Icemen, Southwest Hockey League (1976–77)
Tucson Rustlers, Pacific Hockey League (1978–79)
Tucson Gunners, Western Basketball Association (1978–79)
Tucson Gila Monsters, West Coast Hockey League (1997–99)

Renovation
Throughout 2014, the Tucson Convention Center was renovated at a cost of $22 million, via funding by the Rio Nuevo downtown redevelopment and revitalization district and the City of Tucson, including new bathrooms, lighting, seats, a revamped sound system, a new kitchen and a video scoreboard. Mike Love's Beach Boys headlined a January 4, 2015 concert at the venue, debuting the remodeled arena.

Management of the convention center is now handled by ASM Global.

See also
List of convention centers in the United States
National Register of Historic Places listings in Pima County, Arizona

References

External links

Tucson Arena
Tucson Music Hall
Leo Rich Theater
University of Arizona Wildcats Hockey Website
Tucson Roadrunners Website

Buildings and structures in Tucson, Arizona
College ice hockey venues in the United States
Economy of Tucson, Arizona
Indoor arenas in Arizona
Indoor ice hockey venues in the United States
Sports in Tucson, Arizona
Sports venues in Tucson, Arizona
Tourist attractions in Tucson, Arizona
Music venues in Arizona
Convention centers in Arizona
1971 establishments in Arizona
Event venues on the National Register of Historic Places in Arizona
Sports venues on the National Register of Historic Places in Arizona
Tucson Roadrunners
Sports venues completed in 1971